is a bay in Iwate Prefecture, in the northern Tōhoku region of northern Japan. It is a long and narrow, roughly triangular body of water extending southwest to northeast where it opens to the Pacific Ocean. The  forms its southern border and  forms its southern border.

Economically, the shallow waters of the bay are an important fishery, with shellfish and seaweed cultivation and aquaculture benefiting from nutrients brought into the almost enclosed waters of the bay the Hei River and the effects of the offshore Kuroshio and Oyashio currents. Tourism is also economically important, as parts of the bay are within the borders of the Sanriku Fukkō National Park, including the scenic Jōdogahama coastline.

The Port of Miyako serves as the main seaport for the city of Morioka.

Gallery

References

Bays of Japan
Tourist attractions in Iwate Prefecture
Landforms of Iwate Prefecture
Miyako, Iwate